The Laurentides is a region of Quebec. While it is often called the Laurentians in English, the region includes only part of the Laurentian mountains.

The area is the traditional territory of the Algonquin First Nation. French Canadians began settlement in the first half of the 19th century, establishing an agricultural presence throughout the valleys. During the 20th century, the area also became a popular tourist destination, based on a cottage and lake culture in the summer, and a downhill and cross-country ski culture in the winter. Ski resorts include Saint-Sauveur and Mont Tremblant.

The Laurentides offer a weekend escape for Montrealers and tourists from New England to Ontario, and with the building of a major highway through the area in the 1970s (Autoroute 15), the area has experienced much growth. Its largest city is Saint-Jérôme, in its extreme southeast, with a 2011 census population of 68,456 inhabitants.

Administrative divisions

Regional county municipalities

Indian Reserve
 Doncaster, Quebec

Major communities
Blainville
Boisbriand
Deux-Montagnes
Lachute
Mirabel
Mont-Laurier
RosemèreSaint-Colomban
Saint-Eustache
Saint-Jérôme
Sainte-Anne-des-Plaines
Sainte-Marthe-sur-le-Lac
Sainte-Sophie
Sainte-Thérèse

See also

List of Quebec regions

References

External links

Portail régional des Laurentides Portail régional des Laurentides
Tourisme Laurentides Official website — Site Officiel
CRÉ
Événements culturels dans les Laurentides 

 
Administrative regions of Quebec